Graduate Texts in Mathematics (GTM) is a series of graduate-level textbooks in mathematics published by Springer-Verlag.  The books in this series, like the other Springer-Verlag mathematics series, are yellow books of a standard size (with variable numbers of pages).  The GTM series is easily identified by a white band at the top of the book.

The books in this series tend to be written at a more advanced level than the similar Undergraduate Texts in Mathematics series, although there is a fair amount of overlap between the two series in terms of material covered and difficulty level.

List of books

Introduction to Axiomatic Set Theory, Gaisi Takeuti, Wilson M. Zaring (1982, 2nd ed.)
Measure and Category – A Survey of the Analogies between Topological and Measure Spaces, John C. Oxtoby (1980, 2nd ed.)
Topological Vector Spaces, H. H. Schaefer, M. P. Wolff (1999, 2nd ed.)
A Course in Homological Algebra, Peter Hilton, Urs Stammbach (1997, 2nd ed.)
Categories for the Working Mathematician, Saunders Mac Lane (1998, 2nd ed.)
Projective Planes, Daniel R. Hughes, Fred C. Piper, (1982)
A Course in Arithmetic, Jean-Pierre Serre (1996)
Axiomatic Set Theory, Gaisi Takeuti, Wilson M. Zaring, (1973)
Introduction to Lie Algebras and Representation Theory, James E. Humphreys (1997)

A Course in Simple-Homotopy Theory, Marshall. M. Cohen, (1973)
Functions of One Complex Variable I, John B. Conway (1978, 2nd ed.)
Advanced Mathematical Analysis, Richard Beals  (1973)
Rings and Categories of Modules, Frank W. Anderson, Kent R. Fuller  (1992, 2nd ed.)
Stable Mappings and Their Singularities, Martin Golubitsky, Victor Guillemin, (1974)
Lectures in Functional Analysis and Operator Theory, Sterling K. Berberian, (1974)
The Structure of Fields, David J. Winter, (1974)
Random Processes, Murray Rosenblatt, (1974)
Measure Theory, Paul R. Halmos (1974)
A Hilbert Space Problem Book, Paul R. Halmos (1982, 2nd ed.)
Fibre Bundles, Dale Husemoller (1994, 3rd ed.)

Linear Algebraic Groups, James E. Humphreys  (1975)
An Algebraic Introduction to Mathematical Logic, Donald W. Barnes, John M. Mack (1975)
Linear Algebra, Werner H. Greub (1975)
Geometric Functional Analysis and Its Applications, Richard B. Holmes, (1975)
Real and Abstract Analysis, Edwin Hewitt, Karl Stromberg (1975)
Algebraic Theories, Ernest G. Manes, (1976)
General Topology, John L. Kelley (1975)
Commutative Algebra I, Oscar Zariski, Pierre Samuel (1975)
Commutative Algebra II, Oscar Zariski, Pierre Samuel (1975)

Lectures in Abstract Algebra I: Basic Concepts, Nathan Jacobson (1976)
Lectures in Abstract Algebra II: Linear Algebra, Nathan Jacobson (1984)
Lectures in Abstract Algebra III: Theory of Fields and Galois Theory, Nathan Jacobson (1976)
Differential Topology, Morris W. Hirsch (1976)
Principles of Random Walk, Frank Spitzer (1964, 2nd ed.)
Several Complex Variables and Banach Algebras, Herbert Alexander, John Wermer (1998, 3rd ed.)
Linear Topological Spaces, John L. Kelley, Isaac Namioka (1982)
Mathematical Logic, J. Donald Monk (1976)
Several Complex Variables, H. Grauert, K. Fritzsche (1976)
An Invitation to -Algebras, William Arveson (1976)

Denumerable Markov Chains, John G. Kemeny, J. Laurie Snell, Anthony W. Knapp, D.S. Griffeath (1976)
Modular Functions and Dirichlet Series in Number Theory, Tom M. Apostol (1989, 2nd ed.)
Linear Representations of Finite Groups, Jean-Pierre Serre, Leonhard L. Scott (1977)
Rings of Continuous Functions, Leonard Gillman, Meyer Jerison (1976)
Elementary Algebraic Geometry, Keith Kendig (1977)
Probability Theory I, M. Loève (1977, 4th ed)
Probability Theory II, M. Loève (1978, 4th ed)
Geometric Topology in Dimensions 2 and 3, Edwin E. Moise (1977)
General Relativity for Mathematicians, R. K. Sachs, H. Wu (1983)
Linear Geometry, K. W. Gruenberg, A. J. Weir (1977, 2nd ed.)

Fermat's Last Theorem: A Genetic Introduction to Algebraic Number Theory, Harold M. Edwards (2000)
A Course in Differential Geometry, William Klingenberg, D. Hoffman (1983)
Algebraic Geometry, Robin Hartshorne (2010)
A Course in Mathematical Logic for Mathematicians, Yu. I. Manin, Boris Zilber  (2009, 2nd ed.)
Combinatorics with Emphasis on the Theory of Graphs, Mark E. Watkins, Jack E. Graver (1977)
Introduction to Operator Theory I: Elements of Functional Analysis, Arlen Brown, Carl Pearcy (1977)
Algebraic Topology: An Introduction, William S. Massey (1977)
Introduction to Knot Theory, Richard H. Crowell, Ralph H. Fox (1977)
p-adic Numbers, p-adic Analysis, and Zeta-Functions, Neal Koblitz (1984, 2nd ed.)
Cyclotomic Fields, Serge Lang (1978)

Mathematical Methods of Classical Mechanics, V. I. Arnold, A. Weinstein, K. Vogtmann (1989, 2nd ed.)
Elements of Homotopy Theory, George W. Whitehead (1978)
Fundamentals of the Theory of Groups, M. I. Kargapolov, J. I. Merzljakov (1979)
Graph Theory – An Introductory Course, Béla Bollobás (1979)
Fourier Series – A Modern Introduction Volume 1, R. E. Edwards (1979, 2nd ed.)
Differential Analysis on Complex Manifolds, Raymond O. Wells, Jr. (2008, 3rd ed.)
Introduction to Affine Group Schemes, W. C. Waterhouse (1979)
Local Fields, Jean-Pierre Serre (1979)
Linear Operators in Hilbert Spaces,  (1980)
Cyclotomic Fields II, Serge Lang (1980)

Singular Homology Theory, William S. Massey (1980)
Riemann Surfaces, Irwin Kra (1992, 2nd ed.)
Classical Topology and Combinatorial Group Theory, John Stillwell (1980, 2ed 1993)
Algebra, Thomas W. Hungerford (1974)
Multiplicative Number Theory, Harold Davenport, Hugh Montgomery (2000, 3rd ed.)
Basic Theory of Algebraic Groups and Lie Algebras, G. P. Hochschild (1981)
Algebraic Geometry – An Introduction to Birational Geometry of Algebraic Varieties, Shigeru Iitaka (1982)
Lectures on the Theory of Algebraic Numbers, E. T. Hecke (1981)
A Course in Universal Algebra, Burris, Stanley and Sankappanavar, H. P. (Online) (1981 )
An Introduction to Ergodic Theory, Peter Walters (1982)

A Course in the Theory of Groups,  (1996, 2nd ed.)
Lectures on Riemann Surfaces, Otto Forster (1981)
Differential Forms in Algebraic Topology, Raoul Bott, Loring W. Tu (1982)
Introduction to Cyclotomic Fields, Lawrence C. Washington (1997, 2nd ed.)
A Classical Introduction to Modern Number Theory, Kenneth Ireland, Michael Rosen (1990, 2nd ed.)
Fourier Series – A Modern Introduction Volume 2, R. E. Edwards (1982, 2nd ed.)
Introduction to Coding Theory, J. H. van Lint (3rd ed 1998)
Cohomology of Groups, Kenneth S. Brown (1982)
Associative Algebras, R. S. Pierce (1982)
Introduction to Algebraic and Abelian Functions, Serge Lang (1982, 2nd ed.)

An Introduction to Convex Polytopes, Arne Brondsted (1983)
The Geometry of Discrete Groups, Alan F. Beardon (1983, 2nd print 1995)
Sequences and Series in Banach Spaces, J. Diestel (1984)
Modern Geometry — Methods and Applications Part I: The Geometry of Surfaces, Transformation Groups, and Fields, B. A. Dubrovin, Anatoly Timofeevich Fomenko, Sergei Novikov (1992, 2nd ed.)
Foundations of Differentiable Manifolds and Lie Groups, Frank W. Warner (1983)
Probability-1, Probability-2, Albert N. Shiryaev (2016, 2019, 3rd ed.)
A Course in Functional Analysis, John B. Conway (2007, 2nd ed.)
Introduction to Elliptic Curves and Modular Forms, Neal I. Koblitz (1993, 2nd ed.)
Representations of Compact Lie Groups, Tammo tom Dieck (1985)
Finite Reflection Groups, L.C. Grove, C.T. Benson (1985, 2nd ed.)

Harmonic Analysis on Semigroups – Theory of Positive Definite and Related Functions, Christian Berg, Jens Peter Reus Christensen, Paul Ressel (1984)
Galois Theory, Harold M. Edwards (1984)
Lie Groups, Lie Algebras, and Their Representations, V. S. Varadarajan (1984)
Complex Analysis, Serge Lang (1999, 4th ed.)
Modern Geometry — Methods and Applications Part II: The Geometry and Topology of Manifolds, B. A. Dubrovin, Anatoly Timofeevich Fomenko, Sergei Novikov (1985)
SL2(R), Serge Lang (1985)
The Arithmetic of Elliptic Curves, Joseph H. Silverman (2009, 2nd ed.)
Applications of Lie Groups to Differential Equations, Peter J. Olver (2ed 1993)
Holomorphic Functions and Integral Representations in Several Complex Variables, R. Michael Range (1986)
Univalent Functions and Teichmüller Spaces, O. Lehto (1987)

Algebraic Number Theory, Serge Lang (1994, 2nd ed.)
Elliptic Curves,  (2004, 2nd ed.)
Elliptic Functions, Serge Lang (1987, 2nd ed.)
Brownian Motion and Stochastic Calculus, Ioannis Karatzas, Steven Shreve (2ed 2000)
A Course in Number Theory and Cryptography, Neal Koblitz (2ed 1994)
Differential Geometry: Manifolds, Curves and Surfaces, Marcel Berger, Bernard Gostiaux (1988)
Measure and Integral — Volume 1, John L. Kelley, T.P. Srinivasan (1988)
Algebraic Groups and Class Fields, Jean-Pierre Serre (1988)
Analysis Now, Gert K. Pedersen (1989)
An Introduction to Algebraic Topology, Joseph J. Rotman, (1988)

Weakly Differentiable Functions — Sobolev Spaces and Functions of Bounded Variation, William P. Ziemer (1989)
Cyclotomic Fields I and II, Serge Lang (1990, Combined 2nd ed. )
Theory of Complex Functions, Reinhold Remmert (1991)
Numbers, Heinz-Dieter Ebbinghaus et al. (1990)
Modern Geometry — Methods and Applications Part III: Introduction to Homology Theory, B. A. Dubrovin, Anatoly Timofeevich Fomenko, Sergei Novikov (1990)
Complex Variables — An Introduction, Carlos A. Berenstein, Roger Gay (1991)
Linear Algebraic Groups, Armand Borel (1991)
A Basic Course in Algebraic Topology, William S. Massey (1991)
Partial Differential Equations, Jeffrey Rauch (1991)
Representation Theory, William Fulton, Joe Harris (1991)

Tensor Geometry — The Geometric Viewpoint and its Uses, Christopher T. J. Dodson, Timothy Poston (1991, 2nd ed.)
A First Course in Noncommutative Rings, T. Y. Lam (2001, 2nd ed.)
Iteration of Rational Functions — Complex Analytic Dynamical Systems, Alan F. Beardon (1991)
Algebraic Geometry, Joe Harris (1992)
Coding and Information Theory, Steven Roman (1992)
Advanced Linear Algebra, Steven Roman (2008, 3rd ed.)
Algebra — An Approach via Module Theory, William Adkins, Steven Weintraub (1992)
Harmonic Function Theory, Sheldon Axler, Paul Bourdon, Wade Ramey (2001, 2nd ed.)
A Course in Computational Algebraic Number Theory, Henri Cohen (1996)
Topology and Geometry, Glen E. Bredon (1993)

Optima and Equilibria, Jean-Pierre Aubin (1998)
Gröbner Bases — A Computational Approach to Commutative Algebra, Thomas Becker, Volker Weispfenning (1993)
Real and Functional Analysis, Serge Lang (1993, 3rd ed.)
Measure Theory, J. L. Doob (1994)
Noncommutative Algebra, Benson Farb, R. Keith Dennis (1993)
Homology Theory — An Introduction to Algebraic Topology, James W. Vick (1994, 2nd ed.)
Computability — A Mathematical Sketchbook, Douglas S. Bridges (1994)
Algebraic K-Theory and Its Applications, Jonathan Rosenberg (1994)
An Introduction to the Theory of Groups, Joseph J. Rotman (1995, 4th ed.)
Foundations of Hyperbolic Manifolds, John G. Ratcliffe (2019, 3rd ed.)

Commutative Algebra — with a View Toward Algebraic Geometry, David Eisenbud (1995)
Advanced Topics in the Arithmetic of Elliptic Curves, Joseph H. Silverman (1994)
Lectures on Polytopes, Günter M. Ziegler (1995)
Algebraic Topology — A First Course, William Fulton (1995)
An Introduction to Analysis, Arlen Brown, Carl Pearcy (1995)
Quantum Groups, Christian Kassel (1995)
Classical Descriptive Set Theory, Alexander S. Kechris (1995)
Integration and Probability, Paul Malliavin (1995)
Field Theory, Steven Roman (2006, 2nd ed.)
Functions of One Complex Variable II, John B. Conway (1995)

Differential and Riemannian Manifolds, Serge Lang (1995)
Polynomials and Polynomial Inequalities, Peter Borwein, Tamas Erdelyi (1995)
Groups and Representations, J. L. Alperin, Rowen B. Bell (1995)
Permutation Groups, John D. Dixon, Brian Mortimer (1996)
Additive Number Theory The Classical Bases, Melvyn B. Nathanson (1996)
Additive Number Theory: Inverse Problems and the Geometry of Sumsets, Melvyn B. Nathanson (1996)
Differential Geometry — Cartan's Generalization of Klein's Erlangen Program, R. W. Sharpe (1997)
Field and Galois Theory, Patrick Morandi (1996)
Combinatorial Convexity and Algebraic Geometry, Guenter Ewald (1996)
Matrix Analysis, Rajendra Bhatia (1997)

Sheaf Theory, Glen E. Bredon (1997, 2nd ed.)
Riemannian Geometry, Peter Petersen (2016, 3rd ed.)
Classical Topics in Complex Function Theory, Reinhold Remmert (1998)
Graph Theory, Reinhard Diestel (2017, 5th ed.)
Foundations of Real and Abstract Analysis, Douglas S. Bridges (1998)
An Introduction to Knot Theory, W. B. Raymond Lickorish (1997)
Introduction to Riemannian Manifolds, John M. Lee (2018, 2nd ed.)
Analytic Number Theory , Donald J. Newman (1998)
Nonsmooth Analysis and Control Theory, Francis H. Clarke, Yuri S. Ledyaev, Ronald J. Stern, Peter R. Wolenski (1998)
Banach Algebra Techniques in Operator Theory, Ronald G. Douglas (1998, 2nd ed.)

A Course on Borel Sets, S. M. Srivastava (1998)
Numerical Analysis, Rainer Kress (1998)
Ordinary Differential Equations, Wolfgang Walter (1998)
An Introduction to Banach Space Theory, Robert E. Megginson (1998)
Modern Graph Theory, Béla Bollobás (1998)
Using Algebraic Geometry, David A. Cox, John Little, Donal O'Shea (2005, 2nd ed.)
Fourier Analysis on Number Fields, Dinakar Ramakrishnan, Robert J. Valenza (1999)
Moduli of Curves, Joe Harris, Ian Morrison (1998)
Lectures on the Hyperreals – An Introduction to Nonstandard Analysis, Robert Goldblatt (1998)
Lectures on Modules and Rings, Tsit-Yuen Lam (1999)

Problems in Algebraic Number Theory, M. Ram Murty, Jody Indigo Esmonde (2005, 2nd ed.)
Fundamentals of Differential Geometry, Serge Lang (1999)
Elements of Functional Analysis, Francis Hirsch, Gilles Lacombe (1999)
Advanced Topics in Computational Number Theory, Henri Cohen (2000)
One-Parameter Semigroups for Linear Evolution Equations, Klaus-Jochen Engel, Rainer Nagel (2000)
Elementary Methods in Number Theory, Melvyn B. Nathanson (2000)
Basic Homological Algebra, M. Scott Osborne (2000)
The Geometry of Schemes, Eisenbud, Joe Harris (2000)
A Course in p-adic Analysis, Alain M. Robert (2000)
Theory of Bergman Spaces, Hakan Hedenmalm, Boris Korenblum, Kehe Zhu (2000)

An Introduction to Riemann–Finsler Geometry, David Bao, Shiing-Shen Chern, Zhongmin Shen (2000)
Diophantine Geometry, Marc Hindry, Joseph H. Silverman (2000)
Introduction to Topological Manifolds, John M. Lee (2011, 2nd ed.)
The Symmetric Group — Representations, Combinatorial Algorithms, and Symmetric Functions, Bruce E. Sagan (2001, 2nd ed.)
Galois Theory, Jean-Pierre Escofier (2001)
Rational Homotopy Theory, Yves Félix, Stephen Halperin, Jean-Claude Thomas (2000)
Problems in Analytic Number Theory, M. Ram Murty (2007, 2nd ed.)
Algebraic Graph Theory, Chris Godsil, Gordon Royle (2001)
Analysis for Applied Mathematics, Ward Cheney (2001)
A Short Course on Spectral Theory, William Arveson (2002)

Number Theory in Function Fields, Michael Rosen (2002)
Algebra, Serge Lang (2002, Revised 3rd ed)
Lectures on Discrete Geometry, Jiří Matoušek (2002)
From Holomorphic Functions to Complex Manifolds, Hans Grauert (2002)
Partial Differential Equations, Jürgen Jost, (2013, 3rd ed.)
Algebraic Functions and Projective Curves, David M. Goldschmidt, (2003)
Matrices — Theory and Applications, Denis Serre, (2010, 2nd ed.)
Model Theory: An Introduction, David Marker, (2002)
Introduction to Smooth Manifolds, John M. Lee (2012, 2nd ed.)
The Arithmetic of Hyperbolic 3-Manifolds, Colin Maclachlan, Alan W. Reid, (2003)

Smooth Manifolds and Observables, Jet Nestruev, (2020, 2nd ed.)
Convex Polytopes, Branko Grünbaum (2003, 2nd ed.)
Lie Groups, Lie Algebras, and Representations – An Elementary Introduction, Brian C. Hall, (2015, 2nd ed.)
Fourier Analysis and its Applications, Anders Vretblad, (2003)
Metric Structures in Differential Geometry, Walschap, G., (2004)
Lie Groups, Daniel Bump, (2013, 2nd ed.)
Spaces of Holomorphic Functions in the Unit Ball, Kehe Zhu, (2005)
Combinatorial Commutative Algebra, Ezra Miller, Bernd Sturmfels, (2005)
A First Course in Modular Forms, Fred Diamond, J. Shurman,  (2006)
The Geometry of Syzygies – A Second Course in Algebraic Geometry and Commutative Algebra, David Eisenbud (2005)

An Introduction to Markov Processes, Daniel W. Stroock, (2014, 2nd ed.)
Combinatorics of Coxeter Groups, Anders Björner, Francisco Brenti, (2005)
An Introduction to Number Theory, Graham Everest., Thomas Ward., (2005)
Topics in Banach Space Theory, Albiac, F., Kalton, N. J., (2016, 2nd ed.)
Analysis and Probability — Wavelets, Signals, Fractals, Jorgensen, P. E. T., (2006)
Compact Lie Groups, M. R. Sepanski, (2007)
Bounded Analytic Functions, Garnett, J., (2007)
An Introduction to Operators on the Hardy–Hilbert Space, Ruben A. Martinez-Avendano, Peter Rosenthal, (2007)
A Course in Enumeration, Martin Aigner, (2007)
Number Theory — Volume I: Tools and Diophantine Equations, Henri Cohen, (2007)

Number Theory — Volume II: Analytic and Modern Tools, Henri Cohen, (2007)
The Arithmetic of Dynamical Systems, Joseph H. Silverman, (2007)
Abstract Algebra, Grillet, Pierre Antoine, (2007)
Topological Methods in Group Theory, Geoghegan, Ross, (2007)
Graph Theory, Adrian Bondy, U.S.R. Murty, (2008)
Complex Analysis – In the Spirit of Lipman Bers, Rubí E. Rodríguez, Irwin Kra, Jane P. Gilman (2013, 2nd ed.)
A Course in Commutative Banach Algebras, Kaniuth, Eberhard,  (2008)
Braid Groups, Kassel, Christian, Turaev, Vladimir, (2008)
Buildings Theory and Applications, Abramenko, Peter, Brown, Ken (2008)
Classical Fourier Analysis, Loukas Grafakos (2014, 3rd ed.)

Modern Fourier Analysis, Loukas Grafakos (2014, 3rd ed.)
The Finite Simple Groups, Robert A. Wilson (2009)
Distributions and Operators, Gerd Grubb, (2009)
Elementary Functional Analysis, MacCluer, Barbara D., (2009)
Algebraic Function Fields and Codes, (2009, 2nd ed.)
Symmetry, Representations, and Invariants, Goodman, Roe, Wallach, Nolan R., (2009)
A Course in Commutative Algebra, Kemper, Gregor, (2010)
Deformation Theory, Robin Hartshorne, (2010)
Foundations of Optimization in Finite Dimensions, Osman Guler, (2010)
Ergodic Theory – with a view towards Number Theory, Thomas Ward, Manfred Einsiedler, (2011)

Monomial Ideals, Jürgen Herzog, Hibi Takayuki(2010)
Probability and Stochastics, Erhan Cinlar, (2011)
Essentials of Integration Theory for Analysis, Daniel W. Stroock, (2012)
Analysis on Fock Spaces, Kehe Zhu, (2012)
Functional Analysis, Calculus of Variations and Optimal Control, Francis H. Clarke, (2013)
Unbounded Self-adjoint Operators on Hilbert Space, Konrad Schmüdgen, (2012)
Calculus Without Derivatives, Jean-Paul Penot, (2012)
Quantum Theory for Mathematicians, Brian C. Hall, (2013)
Geometric Analysis of the Bergman Kernel and Metric, Krantz, Steven G., (2013)
Locally Convex Spaces, M Scott Osborne, (2014)

Fundamentals of Algebraic Topology, Steven Weintraub, (2014)
Integer Programming, Michelangelo Conforti, Gérard P. Cornuéjols, Giacomo Zambelli, (2014)
Operator Theoretic Aspects of Ergodic Theory, Tanja Eisner, Bálint Farkas, Markus Haase, Rainer Nagel, (2015)
Homotopical Topology, Anatoly Fomenko, Dmitry Fuchs, (2016, 2nd ed.)
Brownian Motion, Martingales, and Stochastic Calculus, Jean-François Le Gall, (2016)
Differential Geometry – Connections, Curvature, and Characteristic Classes, Loring W. Tu (2017)
Functional Analysis, Spectral Theory, and Applications, Manfred Einsiedler, Thomas Ward (2017)
The Moment Problem, Konrad Schmüdgen (2017)
Modern Real Analysis, William P. Ziemer (2017, 2nd ed.)
Binomial Ideals, Jürgen Herzog, Takayuki Hibi, Hidefumi Ohsugi (2018)

Introduction to Real Analysis, Christopher Heil (2019)
Intersection Homology & Perverse Sheaves with Applications to Singularities, Laurenţiu G. Maxim (2019)
Measure, Integration & Real Analysis, Sheldon Axler (2020)
Basic Representation Theory of Algebras, Ibrahim Assem, Flávio U Coelho (2020)
Spectral Theory – Basic Concepts and Applications, David Borthwick (2020)
An Invitation to Unbounded Representations of ∗-Algebras on Hilbert Space, Konrad Schmüdgen (2020)
Lectures on Convex Geometry, Daniel Hug, Wolfgang Weil (2020)
Explorations in Complex Functions, Richard Beals, Roderick S. C. Wong (2020)
Quaternion Algebras, John Voight (2020)
Ergodic Dynamics – From Basic Theory to Applications, Jane M. Hawkins (2020)

Lessons in Enumerative Combinatorics, Omer Egecioglu , Adriano Garsia (2021)
Mathematical Logic, Heinz-Dieter Ebbinghaus, Jörg Flum, Wolfgang Thomas (2021, 3rd ed. )
Random Walk, Brownian Motion and Martingales, Rabi Bhattacharya, Edward C. Waymire (2021)
Stationary Processes and Discrete Parameter Markov Processes, Rabi Bhattacharya, Edward C. Waymire (2022)
Partial Differential Equations, Wolfgang Arendt, Karsten Urban (2023)
Measure Theory, Probability, and Stochastic Processes, Jean-François Le Gall (2022)
Drinfeld Modules, Mihran Papikian (2023)

See also
Graduate Studies in Mathematics

Notes

External links
 Springer-Verlag's Summary of Graduate Texts in Mathematics

Series of mathematics books
Mathematics textbooks
Mathematics-related lists
Springer Science+Business Media books